Zhang Jiabao (born September 1957) is a Chinese soil scientist who is a researcher at the Institute of Soil Science, Chinese Academy of Sciences. He is also a professor and doctoral supervisor at the University of Chinese Academy of Sciences.

Biography
Zhang was born in Gaoyou, Jiangsu, in September 1957. He attended Nanjing Agricultural University where he received his bachelor's degree in 1982. After completing his master's degree at the Institute of Soil Science, Chinese Academy of Sciences, he attended the University of the Philippines where he obtained his doctor's degree in soil physics in 1990.

Honours and awards
 November 22, 2019 Member of the Chinese Academy of Engineering (CAE)

References

1957 births
Living people
People from Gaoyou
Scientists from Yangzhou
Chinese soil scientists
Nanjing Agricultural University alumni
University of the Philippines alumni
Academic staff of the University of the Chinese Academy of Sciences
Members of the Chinese Academy of Engineering
Educators from Yangzhou